Jackpot is an unincorporated community and census-designated place (CDP) in Elko County, Nevada, United States. The population was 855 as of the 2020 census.

Although officially part of the Elko micropolitan area, Jackpot is often considered part of the Greater Twin Falls region.

In addition to its casino industry, Jackpot has its own schools, golf course, and post office.

Jackpot, along with the rest of Nevada except for the city of West Wendover, is legally in the Pacific Time Zone, but, along with other Idaho border towns such as Jarbidge, Mountain City and Owyhee, unofficially observes Mountain Time, due to its economic ties with the Magic Valley region of southern Idaho. The Nevada Department of Transportation and Federal Aviation Administration recognize this local unofficial observance.

History
After Idaho outlawed all forms of casino gaming in 1954, "Cactus Pete" Piersanti and Don French moved their slot machine operations from Idaho to the Jackpot townsite. Piersanti's and French's gaming establishments were named Cactus Pete's and the Horseshu Club, respectively. Piersanti in particular is credited for founding Jackpot.

In May 1958, the settlement was first recognized by the Elko County commissioners as an unincorporated town named "Horse Shu", with a population of 65, despite a protest over the name by Cactus Pete's. Because the club owners could not agree on a name, the county commissioners renamed it a month later as "Unincorporated Town No. 1". The clubs compromised on the name "Jackpot" in 1959. Jackpot has been noted for its colorful place name.

By 1960, the population had reached 400, but most residents were living in trailers because banks would not approve building loans, being unsure of the town's long-term prospects.

Cactus Pete's management took over the Horseshu in 1964 to form what would eventually become Ameristar Casinos. Cactus Pete's and Horseshu, as well as the independent Barton's Club 93 and the Four Jacks Casino, form the basis of the town's economy to this day.

Geography
Jackpot is located near Salmon Falls Creek and north of Middle Stack Mountain in the Granite Range of northeast Nevada.

Demographics

The 2010 United States Census reported that Jackpot had a population of 1,195. The racial makeup of Jackpot was 61% White (41% Non-Hispanic White), 1% African American, 32% from other races, and 4% from two or more races. Hispanic or Latino of any race were 56%.

There were 451 households, out of which 33% had children under the age of 18 living in them. The average household size was 2.65.  There were 266 families (59% of all households); the average family size was 3.60.

The population was spread out, with 31% under the age of 18 and 9% who were 65 years of age or older.  The median age was 34.2 years.

There were 622 housing units, of which 28% were vacant. Of the occupied units, 36% were owner-occupied and 65% were rented.

The median household income was $39,926, with 15% of the population living below the federal poverty line.

Climate
Jackpot experiences a semi-arid climate with hot summers and cold winters. Even with its relatively cool average temperature, Jackpot receives barely enough precipitation to avoid being classified as a desert climate. Due to Jackpot's high elevation and aridity, temperatures drop sharply after sunset. Summer nights are comfortably cool, even chilly. Winter highs are generally above freezing, and winter nights are bitterly cold, with temperatures often dropping to zero or below.

Transportation
U.S. Route 93 bisects the town as it travels north towards Twin Falls and south towards Wells. The closest airport with commercial service is Magic Valley Regional Airport in Twin Falls. The community is also served by Jackpot Airport.

Education
Jackpot has a public library, a branch of the Elko-Lander-Eureka County Library System.

Casino industry
Jackpot has five main hotels and motels with casinos:
 Barton's Club 93
 Cactus Pete's, owned by Penn National Gaming, is the largest hotel in Jackpot with 300 guest rooms
 Four Jacks Hotel and Casino
 Horseshu Hotel and Casino, owned by Penn National Gaming. The casino is currently closed, but the hotel's 100 guest rooms remain open
 West Star Hotel and Casino, the hotel here remains open but the casino has been closed since summer 2022
 Dotty's

It was previously on schedule to be built starting in late 2010 or early 2011 after zoning and other concerns were addressed by developers and Elko County officials, but there has been no further news or development on the project since.

In popular culture
A 2003 episode of CSI: Crime Scene Investigation is set in Jackpot, but none of the scenes were filmed there.
Satview Broadband, headquartered in Reno, is the local cable television company.
Jackpot was featured in the film Roadside Prophets'' (1992).
The 2001 film 3000 Miles to Graceland, shows Kevin Costner’s character being pulled over 2 miles outside of Jackpot, NV.

Notes

External links
https://www.townofjackpot.com/ 

 Elko County – Jackpot Advisory Board
 Nevada

Census-designated places in Elko County, Nevada
Populated places established in 1954
Elko, Nevada micropolitan area
1954 establishments in Nevada